The Music Victoria Awards of 2015 are the tenth Annual Music Victoria Awards and consist of a series of awards, culminating in an awards ceremony on 11 November 2015.

For the first time, the public awards and the genre specific awards, were all presented in one event.

Immediately following the awards ceremony, Music Victoria CEO Patrick Donovan congratulated all of the nominees and winners saying, "Bringing the genre awards and public awards together was a great success as the nominees are all equally deserving. It was wonderful to see the stars of the music industry under one roof in a huge celebration that showcases the depth of our diverse music scene."

Hall of Fame inductees
 John Farnham, AC/DC, Olivia Newton-John, Archie Roach, Palais Theatre, Sunbury Festival, The Seekers, Thunderbirds, Stan Rofe, Bill Armstrong

Award nominees and winners

All genre Awards
Public voted awards.
Winners indicated in boldface, with other nominees in plain.

Genre Specific Awards
Industry expert panel awards

References

External links
 

2015 in Australian music
2015 music awards
Music Victoria Awards